Nitella opaca is a species of algae in the family Characeae.

Description
Nitella opaca is a dioecious species very similar to Nitella flexilis and difficult to distinguish from it.

Distribution 
Nitella opaca has been observed in fresh waters, mostly lakes. Can be found up to 12 m deep.

Etymology 
From the Latin adjective , meaning "opaque", "not shining".

References 

Charophyta